Asb Rish (also Romanized as Āsb Rīsh; also known as Asbeh Rīs) is a village in Masal Rural District, in the Central District of Masal County, Gilan Province, Iran. At the 2006 census, its population was 113, in 23 families.

References 

Populated places in Masal County